is the Graduate School of Business at Doshisha University in Kyoto, Japan.

History
Originally established in 2004, Doshisha Business School began solely with a Master of Business Administration programme in Japanese (now abbreviated to JMBA), but commenced a Global MBA program (GMBA) in which all classes are provided in English, in 2009.
In October 2014, the Global MBA became an independent degree program within DBS approved by the Ministry of Education, Culture, Sports, Science and Technology.

MBA programs
 MBA (JMBA) - Japanese-language coursework MBA program for working professionals
 Global MBA (GMBA) - Full-time English-language program

Campus
Doshisha Business School is located within the Kambaikan building of Doshisha University's Imadegawa campus. The building was completed in March 2004 and also houses the Doshisha Law School. DBS also has a satellite campus located in Umeda, Osaka.

International agreements
DBS has international agreements with the following universities:
University of Tübingen School of Business and Economics, Germany
University of Gothenburg, Gothenburg, Sweden
University of Denver Daniels School of Business, USA
Xi’an Jiaotong University, Xi’an, China
Dalian University of Technology, Dalian, China

References

External links
 Doshisha Business School Global MBA website
 Doshisha Business School Japanese MBA website

Business schools in Japan
Educational institutions established in 2004
Doshisha University
2004 establishments in Japan